Igor Yuryevich Voznesensky (born 28 May 1985) is a former professional association football player from Russia.

Club career
He played for the main squad of FC Lokomotiv Moscow in the Russian Premier League Cup.

He played 3 seasons in the Russian Football National League for FC Oryol, FC Khimki and FC Shinnik Yaroslavl.

External links
 
 

1985 births
Sportspeople from Oryol
Living people
Russian footballers
Association football midfielders
FC Lokomotiv Moscow players
FC Khimki players
FC Shinnik Yaroslavl players
FC Oryol players
FC Tyumen players
FC Avangard Kursk players
FC Dynamo Bryansk players
Kazakhstan Premier League players
Russian expatriate footballers
Expatriate footballers in Kazakhstan
Russian expatriate sportspeople in Kazakhstan